The women's pentathlon event  at the 1995 IAAF World Indoor Championships was held on 10 March.

Medalists

Results

60 metres hurdles

High jump

Shot put

Long jump

800 metres

Final standings

References

Pentathlon
Combined events at the World Athletics Indoor Championships
1995 in women's athletics